Clinton is a village in British Columbia, Canada, located approximately  northwest of Cache Creek and 30 km south of 70 Mile House.

It is considered by some to straddle the southern edge of the Cariboo country of British Columbia, although others consider Ashcroft-Cache Creek, Lillooet, Savona, Kamloops and even Lytton and Spences Bridge to be in the Cariboo. Clinton, however, does sit immediately below the southern edge of the Cariboo Plateau. Clinton has a number of attractions including horse-back riding, big game viewing, hiking, fishing and other outdoor activities.

Every May, Clinton is home to the Annual Ball held on the Victoria Day weekend, where many people dress as the first settlers did. The Annual Ball kicks off the Village's Heritage week with the parade and the May rodeo and dance ending Heritage week. The Clinton Annual Ball is one of British Columbia's oldest continual events having first been held in 1867 and was a highlight of the social calendar in the British Columbia Interior for many decades. The Clinton Museum, built in 1892, has a number of historical artifacts on display that date back to the gold rush and founding of the area.

Name origin
Originally known as Cut-Off Valley, "47 Mile House" or "47 Mile", Clinton was named in 1863 upon completion of the Cariboo Wagon Road in the area for Henry Fiennes Pelham Clinton, the 5th Duke of Newcastle, who was colonial secretary in 1854 and from 1859 to 1864.

Demographics 

Transportation
Highway 97 runs through the village north-south, meeting just south of downtown with the Pavilion Mountain Road, which connects from Pavilion and Kelly Lake and is the route of the Old Cariboo Road and follows what is known as Cut-Off Valley from the foot of the road over Pavilion Mountain, which is also the route used by the British Columbia Railway although that route does not traverse Pavilion Mountain but comes via the Fraser Canyon via Moran and Arden Forest. The ranching communities of Jesmond, Kostering and Big Bar can be accessed via a road which has its junction with the Pavilion Mountain Road at Kelly Lake, which is also the location of Downing Provincial Park, which encompasses that lake. The same road is the access for Edge Hills and Marble Range Provincial Parks and also for the Big Bar Ferry to the west side of the Fraser River, which connects to the Slok Creek FSR to Lillooet. Clinton was, until adoption of its present name, known as "47 Mile House", that being the distance from Lillooet on the Old Cariboo Road.

Also diverging from Highway 97 at Clinton is the route of the original Cariboo Road, which climbs a gentler grade up the side of the Bonaparte River valley up to the Cariboo Plateau, via Chasm and the associated provincial park and the community of Lone Butte. The BCR line also follows roughly the same route and has railstops at Chasm, Lone Butte and the Flying U Ranch, one of the province's oldest dude ranches. Other roads lead east from the Cariboo Road routing to Bonaparte Lake and Bonaparte Provincial Park and various provincial parks in that area. Loon Lake is accessed via the Loon Lake Road, which departs Highway 97 eastwards to the south of Clinton.

References

External links
 Official website

Villages in British Columbia
Populated places in the Thompson-Nicola Regional District
Geography of the Cariboo
Bonaparte Country